.mn is the Internet country code top-level domain (ccTLD) for Mongolia. It is administered by .MN Registry, Datacom. The domain name is composed of the consonants in the first syllable of the country name. The .MN registry is operated under the thick registry model. Administrative, Billing, Technical and Registrant contacts are required. The Redemption Grace Period (RGP) is available for .MN domains.

The following second-level domains registration for free to qualifying entities:
 .gov.mn – government institutions
 .edu.mn – educational institutions
 .org.mn – non-profit organizations

.MN Registry signed the .mn zone with DNSSEC on 18 November 2010.

Use outside Mongolia

The .mn domain name has been used to represent the U.S. state of Minnesota, such as by the Minnesota Legislature (senate.mn and house.mn), but such use is not official in the state.

The .mn domain elsewhere outside Mongolia is used primarily as a domain hack, for example vita.mn (a play on vitamin). Another example is cart.mn (a play on the South Park character Eric Cartman, which redirects to www.southparkstudios.com).

References

External links

Domain registrars 
 Domain.mn – .MN Domain Registry : .MN Domain Registrar
 TEC.mn – TEC.mn Service of DomainNRG : .MN Domain Registrar from Minneapolis, MN

Country code top-level domains
Internet in Mongolia
Computer-related introductions in 1995
Science and technology in Mongolia

sv:Toppdomän#M